The 1927 Frankford Yellow Jackets season was their fourth in the National Football League. The team failed to improve on their previous output of 14–1–2, winning only six league games to finish in seventh place in the league standings.

Schedule

Standings

Players
Carl Davis, end, tackle, guard
Bill Donohoe, back
Joey Maxwell, center, end
Frank McGrath, end
Dick Moynihan, fullback, blocking back
Pete Richards, center
Ned Wilcox, back

References

Frankford Yellow Jackets seasons
Frankford Yellow Jackets
Frankford Yellow Jackets